Keisuke Miyamoto (宮元 啓介, born 16 December 1992) is a Japanese kickboxer.

Kickboxing career
Miyamoto started Karate training at the age of 4 and won multiple titles in the youth categories before transitioning to Hashimoto Dojo and begin a kickboxing career in 2008.

In 2009 Miyamoto participated in the K-1 Koshien selection and won the Kanto B-block tournament. The win qualified him to the tournament Quarter Finals happening at the K-1 World MAX 2009 World Championship Tournament Final event on October 26, 2009. He lost by unanimous decision to future winner Masaaki Noiri.

After an amateur career of 22 wins, 2 defeats and 1 draw Miyamoto turned professional on January 31, 2010, at the MAJKF BREAK 1 event. He defeated Takashi Ohno by split decision.

Miyamoto won the MAJKF Rookie Tournament Bantamweight title on October 10, 2010, at the MAJKF BREAK 3 event where he defeated Hiroshi Watabe by unanimous decision.

On January 21, 2012, Miyamoto defeated Yu Hiramoto by fifth-round knockout to capture the vacant MAJKF Bantamweight title at MAJKF FIGHT FOR PEACE III BREAK-22.

On September 22, 2012, Miyamoto defeated Ryuya Kusakabe by unanimous decision at NJKF KICK TO THE FUTURE 6 to capture WBC Muay Thai Japan Super Bantamweight title.

On September 27, 2015, Miyamoto defeated Alexis Barateau by second-round knockout for the WBC Muay Thai International Super Bantamweight title.

On October 9, 2016, Miyamoto the most notable title of his career when he defeated Chuchai Kaewsamrit by knockout at a Japan Kickboxing Innovation event for the WPMF World Super Bantamweight title.

Prior to the fight it was announced that Miyamoto's rematch against Yugo Kato at NO KICK NO LIFE on January 9, 2021, would be the last of his career. He lost the fight by majority decision and retired at the age of 29.

Championships and accomplishments

Kickboxing
Professional
Martial Arts Japan Kickboxing Federation
 2010 MAJKF Bantamweight Rookie Tournament Winner
 2012 MAJKF Super Bantamweight Champion (defended once)
World Boxing Council Muay Thai
 2012 WBC Muay Thai Japan Super Bantamweight Champion (Defended once)
 2015 WBC Muay Thai International Super Bantamweight Champion
Japan Kickboxing Innovation
 2013 INNOVATION Super Bantamweight Champion (Defended twice)
World Professional Muaythai Federation
 2016 WPMF World Super Bantamweight Champion

Amateur
 2009 K-1 Koshien Kanto B-block Tournament Winner
 2009 JAKF All Japan Featherweight Champion & Event MVP

Karate
 2007 FSA All Japan Jr. Championship Middle School Winner
 2007 FSA Asian Jr. Championship High School Winner
 2008 JKJO All Japan Jr. Championship High School Winner
 2008 IKO Kyokushinkaikan Youth (U-16) World Championship 3rd place

Fight record

|-  style="background:#fbb;"
| 2022-01-09 || Loss ||align=left| Yugo Kato || NO KICK NO LIFE  || Tokyo, Japan || Decision (Majority) || 5 ||3:00

|-  style="background:#fbb;"
| 2021-09-20 || Loss ||align=left| Ryota Mawatari || Japan Kickboxing Innovation - Resistance 3 || Tokyo, Japan || Decision (Majority) || 5 ||3:00

|-  style="background:#cfc;"
| 2021-02-24 || Win ||align=left| Yugo Kato || NO KICK NO LIFE New Chapter -Ungai Soten- || Tokyo, Japan || Decision (Majority) || 3 ||3:00

|-  style="text-align:center; background:#fbb;"
| 2020-11-08|| Loss ||align=left| Eisaku Ogasawara || REBELS 67, RED rules -55.5 kg Championship Tournament Semi Final || Tokyo, Japan || Decision (Majority) || 3 || 3:00

|- align="center"  bgcolor="#cfc"
| 2020-09-12|| Win ||align=left| Shogo Kuriaki ||KNOCK OUT CHAMPIONSHIP.2 || Tokyo, Japan || Decision (Unanimous) ||3  || 3:00

|- align="center"  bgcolor="#cfc"
| 2019-11-01|| Win ||align=left| Yukinori Ogasawara ||KNOCK OUT 2019 BREAKING DOWN || Tokyo, Japan || Decision (Unanimous) ||3  || 3:00

|- align="center"  bgcolor="#cfc"
| 2019-07-15|| Win ||align=left| Naoya || Japan Kickboxing Innovation - Join Forces 14 || Tokyo, Japan || Ext.R Decision (Unanimous) ||6  || 3:00

|-  style="text-align:center; background:#fbb;"
| 2019-04-29|| Loss ||align=left| Rasta || KNOCK OUT 2019 SPRING: THE FUTURE IS IN THE RING || Tokyo, Japan || Decision (Unanimous) || 5 || 3:00

|- align="center"  bgcolor="#cfc"
| 2019-02-17|| Win ||align=left| KOUMA || Pancrase REBELS Ring 1 || Tokyo, Japan || Decision (Unanimous) ||3  || 3:00

|- align="center"  bgcolor="#cfc"
| 2018-12-08|| Win ||align=left| Takahiro Sakuragi|| Japan Kickboxing Innovation - Champions Carnival 2018 || Tokyo, Japan || Decision (Unanimous) ||5  || 3:00

|- align="center"  bgcolor="#cfc"
| 2018-10-08|| Win ||align=left| Dawsakorn Mor.Tassanai|| REBELS 58 || Tokyo, Japan || Ext.R Decision (Split) ||4  || 3:00

|- align="center"  bgcolor="#c5d2ea"
| 2018-08-03|| Draw ||align=left| Kyosuke Yasuda|| REBELS 58 || Tokyo, Japan || Decision (Majority) ||5  || 3:00

|-  style="text-align:center; background:#fbb;"
| 2018-05-03 || Loss||align=left| Ryo Takahashi || KNOCK OUT 2018 Osaka 1st || Osaka, Japan || Decision (Unanimous) || 5 || 3:00

|- align="center"  bgcolor="#c5d2ea"
| 2018-02-18|| Draw ||align=left| Yukinori Ogasawara|| REBELS 54 || Tokyo, Japan || Decision (Unanimous) ||3  || 3:00

|-  style="text-align:center; background:#fbb;"
| 2017-12-10 || Loss||align=left| Rui Ebata || KNOCK OUT 2017 in Ryogoku || Tokyo, Japan || Decision (Majority) || 5 || 3:00

|-  style="text-align:center; background:#cfc;"
| 2017-10-04||Win ||align=left| Yuki Noro || ROAD TO KNOCK OUT 5 || Tokyo, Japan || KO (High Kick) || 3 || 2:05

|-  style="text-align:center; background:#cfc;"
| 2017-05-10||Win ||align=left| Kazuyuki Fushimi || ROAD TO KNOCK OUT 1 || Tokyo, Japan || TKO (Corner Stoppage) || 3 || 2:58

|- align="center"  bgcolor="#cfc"
| 2017-03-11|| Win ||align=left| Hidemaru || REBELS 49 || Tokyo, Japan || Decision (Unanimous) ||3  || 3:00

|-  style="text-align:center; background:#fbb;"
| 2016-12-05||Loss ||align=left| Eisaku Ogasawara || KNOCK OUT vol.0 || Tokyo, Japan || KO (Head Kick) || 3 || 2:53

|-  style="text-align:center; background:#cfc;"
| 2016-10-09 || Win ||align=left| Chuchai Kaewsamrit || JAPAN KICKBOXING INNOVATION - Okayama Gym Show 3 || Kurashiki, Japan || KO (Body Kick) || 2 || 2:09
|-
! style=background:white colspan=9 |

|-  style="text-align:center; background:#c5d2ea;"
| 2016-08-07 || Draw ||align=left| Masahide Kudo || KUNLUN FIGHT 49×REBELS.45 || Tokyo, Japan || Decision (Majority) || 3 || 3:00

|-  style="text-align:center; background:#cfc;"
| 2016-06-24 || Loss ||align=left| Shodai Kitazono  || NO KICK NO LIFE ～The Final～ || Tokyo, Japan || Decision (Unanimous) || 5 || 3:00

|-  style="text-align:center; background:#cfc;"
| 2016-04-29 || Win ||align=left| Yukinobu Nakatsuka || JAPAN KICKBOXING INNOVATION Dream Force-11 || Tokyo, Japan || Decision (Unanimous) || 5 || 3:00
|-
! style=background:white colspan=9 |

|-  style="text-align:center; background:#fbb;"
| 2016-03-12|| Loss || align=left| Tenshin Nasukawa|| No Kick No Life 2016 || Tokyo, Japan || KO (left knee to the body) || 2 || 0:26

|-  style="text-align:center; background:#cfc;"
| 2015-12-12 || Win ||align=left| Nakornlek AceGym || JAPAN KICKBOXING INNOVATION Champions Carnival 2015 || Tokyo, Japan || TKO (Corner Stoppage) || 4 || 2:39

|-  style="text-align:center; background:#cfc;"
| 2015-09-27 || Win ||align=left| Alexis Barateau || NJKF 2015 6th || Tokyo, Japan || KO (Body Punches)|| 2 || 3:04
|-
! style=background:white colspan=9 |

|-  style="text-align:center; background:#fbb;"
| 2015-06-21|| Loss ||align=left| Taiki Naito|| Shoot Boxing 2015～SB30th Anniversary～ act.3|| Tokyo, Japan || Decision (Unanimous) || 3|| 3:00

|-  style="text-align:center; background:#cfc;"
| 2015-04-26 || Win ||align=left| Yukinobu Nakatsuka || JAPAN KICKBOXING INNOVATION Dream Force-7 || Tokyo, Japan || Decision (Unanimous) || 5 || 3:00
|-
! style=background:white colspan=9 |

|-  style="text-align:center; background:#fbb;"
| 2015-02-11 || Loss ||align=left| Sota Ichinohe  || NO KICK, NO LIFE 2015|| Tokyo, Japan || Decision (Majority) || 5 || 3:00

|-  style="text-align:center; background:#cfc;"
| 2014-12-13 || Win ||align=left| Yu Wor.Wanchai || JAPAN KICKBOXING INNOVATION Champions Carnival 2014 || Tokyo, Japan || Decision (Unanimous) || 5 || 3:00

|-  style="text-align:center; background:#c5d2ea;"
| 2014-09-27 || Draw ||align=left| Muengfang AceGym || JAPAN KICKBOXING INNOVATION Dream Force-5 || Tokyo, Japan || Decision (Majority)|| 5 || 3:00

|-  style="text-align:center; background:#fbb;"
| 2014-07-21 || Loss ||align=left| Kunitaka  || NJKF 2014 5th|| Tokyo, Japan || Decision (Split) || 5 || 3:00
|-
! style=background:white colspan=9 |

|-  style="text-align:center; background:#cfc;"
| 2014-04-29 || Win ||align=left| Shusaku Shirai || JAPAN KICKBOXING INNOVATION Dream Force-I || Tokyo, Japan || Decision (Unanimous) || 5 || 3:00

|-  style="text-align:center; background:#cfc;"
| 2014-03-16 || Win ||align=left| Yuki || REBELS.25 a.k.a INNOVATION's day || Tokyo, Japan || Decision (Unanimous) || 3 || 3:00

|-  style="text-align:center; background:#fbb;"
| 2014-01-12 || Loss ||align=left| Shiro || SNKA WINNERS 2014 || Tokyo, Japan || Decision (Unanimous) || 5 || 3:00

|-  style="text-align:center; background:#c5d2ea;"
| 2013-09-22 || Draw ||align=left| Hiroya Haga || NJKF 2013 6th || Tokyo, Japan || Decision (Unanimous) || 5 || 3:00
|-
! style=background:white colspan=9 |

|-  style="text-align:center; background:#fbb;"
| 2013-07-21 || Loss ||align=left| Hidemaru || REBELS.17 || Tokyo, Japan || Decision (Unanimous) || 5 || 3:00

|-  style="text-align:center; background:#fbb;"
| 2013-06-16 || Loss ||align=left| Ryuma Tobe || Krush 29 || Tokyo, Japan || Ext.R Decision (Unanimous) || 4 || 3:00

|-  style="text-align:center; background:#cfc;"
| 2013-03-20 || Win ||align=left| Masahiro || Krush 27 || Tokyo, Japan || Decision (Unanimous) || 5 || 3:00

|-  style="text-align:center; background:#c5d2ea;"
| 2013-01-27 || Draw ||align=left| Kunihiro || MAJKF BREAK－33 ～FIGHT FOR PEACE 4  || Tokyo, Japan || Decision || 5 || 3:00
|-
! style=background:white colspan=9 |

|-  style="text-align:center; background:#fbb;"
| 2012-12-09 || Loss ||align=left| Kantipong Sor.Dedamrong || MAJKF BREAK－32 ～SEIZE || Tokyo, Japan || TKO (Referee Stoppage) || 3 || 0:50

|-  style="text-align:center; background:#cfc;"
| 2012-09-22 || Win ||align=left| Ryuya Kusakabe || NJKF KICK TO THE FUTURE 6  || Tokyo, Japan || Decision (Unanimous) || 5 || 3:00
|-
! style=background:white colspan=9 |

|- style="background:#c5d2ea;"
| 2012-07-15|| Draw||align=left| Pinsiam Sor.Amnuaysirichoke || MA Japan Kick KICK GUTS 2012 ||  Tokyo, Japan || Decision (Unanimous) || 3 || 3:00

|-  style="text-align:center; background:#cfc;"
| 2012-01-29 || Win ||align=left| Arato|| NJKF KICK TO THE FUTURE 2  || Tokyo, Japan || Decision (Majority) || 3 || 3:00

|-  style="text-align:center; background:#cfc;"
| 2012-03-18 || Win ||align=left| Minoru Junibayashi|| MAJKF BREAK-24 ～SAGITTARIUS～  || Tokyo, Japan || KO (Body shot) || 3 || 2:59

|-  style="text-align:center; background:#cfc;"
| 2012-01-22 || Win ||align=left| Yu Hiramoto|| MAJKF FIGHT FOR PEACE III BREAK-22 - Super Bantamweight Championship Tournament Final || Tokyo, Japan || KO (Right High kick) || 5 || 1:50
|-
! style=background:white colspan=9 |

|-  style="text-align:center; background:#cfc;"
| 2011-11-20 || Win ||align=left| Kunihiro || MAJKF BREAK－20 ～RAISE～ - Super Bantamweight Championship Tournament Semi Final || Tokyo, Japan || Decision (Unanimous) || 5 || 3:00

|-  style="text-align:center; background:#fbb;"
| 2011-09-25 || Loss ||align=left| Takayuki Umehara|| MAJKF BREAK-17～Khaos～  || Tokyo, Japan || Decision (Unanimous) || 5 || 3:00

|-  style="text-align:center; background:#cfc;"
| 2011-06-18 || Win ||align=left| Masashi Tanaka || MAJKF BREAK-14 ～IRIS～ || Tokyo, Japan || KO (3 Knockdowns) || 3 || 2:14

|-  style="text-align:center; background:#cfc;"
| 2011-03-26 || Win ||align=left| Keita Matsumoto || MAJKF BREAK-11 ～NEXUS～ || Tokyo, Japan || KO (Left Body Hook) || 2 || 2:33

|-  style="text-align:center; background:#cfc;"
| 2011-01-15 || Win ||align=left| Kazu Nakadankari || MAJKF BREAK-8  FIGHT FOR PEACE 2 || Tokyo, Japan || Decision (Unanimous) || 3 || 3:00

|-  style="text-align:center; background:#cfc;"
| 2010-10-10 || Win ||align=left| Hiroshi Watabe || MAJKF BREAK-3 - Bantamweight Rookie Tournament Final || Tokyo, Japan || Decision (Unanimous) || 3 || 3:00
|-
! style=background:white colspan=9 |

|-  style="text-align:center; background:#cfc;"
| 2010-07-31 || Win ||align=left| Yojiro Kikuchi || Bigbang|| Tokyo, Japan || Decision (Unanimous) || 3 ||3:00

|-  style="text-align:center; background:#cfc;"
| 2010-06-27 || Win ||align=left| Ryo Fujieda || MAJKF BREAK-3 - Bantamweight Rookie Tournament Semi Final || Tokyo, Japan || KO || 1 || 1:10

|-  style="text-align:center; background:#cfc;"
| 2010-04-18 || Win ||align=left| Ryusei Ikeda || J-NETWORK J-FIGHT in SHINJUKU ～vol.14～ || Tokyo, Japan || KO || 3 || 2:23

|-  style="text-align:center; background:#cfc;"
| 2010-01-31 || Win ||align=left| Takashi Ohno ||MAJKF BREAK-1 || Tokyo, Japan || Decision (Split) || 3 || 2:00

|-
| colspan=9 | Legend:    

|- bgcolor="#fbb"
| 2010-11-20 || Loss ||align=left| Hiroto Iwasaki ||  K-1 Koshien 2009 King of Under 18 Tournament Final  || Tokyo, Japan || Decision (Split) || 1 || 2:00

|- bgcolor="#fbb"
| 2009-10-26 || Loss ||align=left| Masaaki Noiri || K-1 World MAX 2009 World Championship Tournament Final, K-1 Koshien 2009 King of Under 18 Tournament Quarter Finals || Yokohama, Japan || Decision (unanimous) || 3 || 2:00

|- bgcolor="#cfc"
| 2009-08-10 || Win ||align=left| Taishi Hiratsuka  ||  K-1 Koshien 2009 King of Under 18 Tournament Final 16 || Tokyo, Japan || TKO (Referee Stoppage) || 1 || 1:38

|- bgcolor="#cfc"
| 2009-06-28 || Win ||align=left| Kohei Nishikawa  ||  K-1 Koshien 2009 King of Under 18 Kanto Selection, Final || Chiba, Japan || Ext.R Decision  || 2 || 2:00

|- bgcolor="#cfc"
| 2009-06-28 || Win ||align=left| Namito Izawa ||  K-1 Koshien 2009 King of Under 18 Kanto Selection, Semi Final || Chiba, Japan || Decision || 1 || 2:00

|- bgcolor="#cfc"
| 2009-06-28 || Win ||align=left| Nobuto Ikeda ||  K-1 Koshien 2009 King of Under 18 Kanto Selection, Quarter Final || Chiba, Japan || Decision || 1 || 2:00

|- bgcolor="#cfc"
| 2009-06-28 || Win ||align=left| Shun Fuji  ||  K-1 Koshien 2009 King of Under 18 Kanto Selection, 1/8 Final || Chiba, Japan || Decision || 1 || 2:00
|-
| colspan=9 | Legend:

See also
 List of male kickboxers

References

1992 births
Living people
Japanese male kickboxers
People from Iruma, Saitama
Sportspeople from Saitama Prefecture